Livingston Depot is a former train station in Livingston, Montana, built by the Northern Pacific Railway in 1902. The station last saw passenger rail service in 1979 when Amtrak discontinued the North Coast Hiawatha. Since 1987 the restored building has anchored Livingston's downtown historic district as the Livingston Depot Center.

History

Livingston Depot was designed by the Minnesota firm of Reed and Stem, the first architects for New York City's Grand Central Terminal in an Italianate style with red and yellow brick and ornate terra cotta detailing from lions' heads to floral figures and the Northern Pacific's trademark yin-yang emblem, and its interior includes inlaid terrazzo and tiling including the same NP emblem.  It was constructed in approximately three years for $112,000 and dedicated in the summer of 1902. 

The current facility accommodated traffic for both the main and Yellowstone Park Branch lines, and it and its predecessors thus functioned as the primary gateway to Yellowstone National Park for most of its visitors for approximately a quarter century.  It served as the headquarters for the NP's Rocky Mountain division, including orders and telegraphy, and would host active rail traffic including the North Coast Limited runs.  The complex combines a main building, a restaurant building, and a baggage building connected by a colonnade surrounding a courtyard facing the railroad tracks.  Its shorter-lived precursors were an 1882 wooden facility, which burned down, and an 1888 brick structure, which grew to be inadequate for the rapidly increasing and somewhat affluent passenger traffic the NP was bringing to visit Yellowstone.    

The earliest fortunes of the Depot were tied to the fate of the railroad.  Initially it was a busy connection center, sited adjacent to the large Livingston shops complex and served as an NP division headquarters, being roughly equidistant between the termini of St. Paul, Minnesota, and Seattle, Washington. Toward about World War II, rail travel to the park tapered off heavily in favor of automobile visits, and chiefly charter excursions used the Yellowstone Park line.  In 1970 the NP merged with the Chicago, Burlington and Quincy Railroad, Great Northern Railway, and Spokane, Portland and Seattle Railway, forming the facility's new owner, the Burlington Northern Railroad. Passenger train service was taken over by Amtrak in 1971.  In 1979 Amtrak discontinued the North Coast Hiawatha in favor of the Empire Builder track on the high line, the old line of the Great Northern, and the Depot began to suffer some neglect.  By the mid 1980s the BN began unsuccessfully to seek a buyer for it.  Local citizens lobbied for its donation to the city and adoption by the non-profit Livingston Depot Foundation which they created for its extensive restoration and subsequent operation.

Livingston Depot Center
In summer of 1987 the depot reopened as the Livingston Depot Center, as a museum and community center in the heart of the city. It continues to operate .  The museum is typically open from late May to mid-September. During the off-season the facility hosts wedding receptions, holiday parties, blues and other concerts, cards nights, historic talks, economic development forums, and similar events. A model railroad club meets in its basement.  During Fourth of July weekend it hosts an arts festival in the adjacent Depot Rotary Park located parallel to the train tracks.  The facility also underwent a roof restoration and restabilization project from approximately 2004 to 2007.

See also 
Livingston, Montana
Park County, Montana

External links 
Official Website
Blues at the Depot music series official site
Northern Pacific Railway Historic Association
Livingston, Montana – TrainWeb

Railway stations in the United States opened in 1902
Railway stations closed in 1979
Former Northern Pacific Railway stations
Reed and Stem buildings
Former Amtrak stations in Montana
Buildings and structures in Park County, Montana
Museums in Park County, Montana
1902 establishments in Montana
Historic district contributing properties in Montana
 National